Vaterpolski klub Šibenik, commonly known as VK Šibenik or simply Šibenik, was a men's professional water polo club from the town on the Croatian coast called Šibenik. Club offices were on address Prilaz tvornici BB.

History 
The club was part of the Croatian First League for many years. Until 2002 the club played their home matches on the pool in Solaris (10 km from Šibenik) but then the pool was closed and there was a big break which took a part on the club. Finally, in fall 2006 the new pool in Crnica was built and the club started to advance. With the arrival of new sponsors Nautical Center Prgin the club changed its name to Šibenik NCP. Club was dissolved in August 2015 and by merging VK Adriatic and VK Šibenik, a new water polo club VK Solaris was founded.

Honours
Although it never won a championship, the club was a very tough rival to all other clubs. Also, many players from Šibenik were in national teams or they were in state champions; but the best of them are: Perica Bukić, Renato Vrbičić, Siniša Belamarić, Denis Šupe and Andrija Komadina. 

The best success accomplished in the 2006–07 season when it secured second place in the LEN Euro Cup and third one in the Croatian Championship, leading by coach Ivica Tucak, present-day Croatia men's national water polo team head coach.

Also, one of the biggest successes include winning the second place in the 1986–87 Yugoslav Water Polo Championship season while in the 2008–09 season the club played LEN Euroleague, the strongest water polo competition under the auspices of LEN.

Notable players
 Siniša Belamarić  
 Perica Bukić
 Andrija Komadina 
 Merrill Moses
 Mile Nakić
 Antonio Petković
 Ivica Tucak
 Renato Vrbičić

Notable coaches
 Danko Jerković
 Mile Nakić
 Toni Petrić
 Ivica Tucak
 Renato Vrbičić

External links 
Kazan - Šibenik: So close... Article about LEN Euro Cup finals
Home pages

Water polo clubs in Croatia
VK Šibenik
Sports clubs established in 1924
Sports clubs disestablished in 2015
1924 establishments in Croatia
2015 disestablishments in Croatia